Thukima is a village development committee in the Himalayas of Taplejung District in the Province No. 1 of north-eastern Nepal. At the time of the 1991 Nepal census it had a population of 2535 people living in 486 individual households.

References

In Thukima there are Limbu, Sherpa, Tamang, Bramhin, and Chetri community people. Thukima has on Ilaka hospital in Mahashreng

External links
UN map of the municipalities of Taplejung District

Populated places in Taplejung District